Almut Gitter Jones (8 September 192312 October 2013) was a German-American botanist, mycologist, and plant taxonomist known for her work researching the genus Aster, as well as for her work as curator of the herbarium at the University of Illinois.

Jones was born Almut Gitter in Oldenburg to Alfred and Emma ( Eickhorst) Gitter. She married fellow botanist George Neville Jones in Urbana, Illinois in 1958. She died in Urbana, Illinois. 

She described over fifty species, and the genus Almutaster of the family Asteraceae was named for her in 1982.

References 

1923 births
2013 deaths
American women botanists
20th-century American botanists
20th-century American women scientists
21st-century American botanists
21st-century American women scientists
University of Illinois alumni
University of Illinois faculty
People from Oldenburg (city)
German emigrants to the United States
American women academics